Where Shadows Forever Reign is the sixth studio album by black metal band Dark Funeral. The album was released through Century Media Records on 3 June 2016. Where Shadows Forever Reign is the first album to feature vocalist Heljarmadr and the last to feature drummer Dominator. The album was recorded in Dugout Studios in Uppsala Sweden and the cover art for the album was created by artist Kristian 'Necrolord' Wåhlin.

Track listing

Personnel

Dark Funeral
 Heljarmadr – vocals
 Lord Ahriman – lead guitar, bass
 Chaq Mol – rhythm guitar
 Dominator – drums

Production
 Necrolord – Artwork
 George Nerantzis – Engineering, Mixing, Mastering
 Daniel Bergstrand – Producer, Engineering, Mixing
 Lord Ahriman – Producer, Layout, Photography
 Michaela Barkensjö – Photography
 Carsten Drescher – Layout

Charts

References

External links
 Dark Funeral discography
 Encyclopaedia Metallum

Dark Funeral albums
2016 albums
Century Media Records albums